The Formula E: Accelerate was a professional esports competition created by Formula E, following the success of 2020's ABB Formula E Race at Home Challenge in support of UNICEF. The competition was run on the platform of rFactor 2. The virtual tournament was broadcast on various Formula E social and streaming platforms, such as Twitch, Facebook, and YouTube.

In the open qualifiers that opened in January 2021, online racers were offered the incredible opportunity to earn a virtual seat on the official grid line-up for one of the 12 esports teams from the ABB FIA Formula E World Championship. Over 600 of the best pro sims around as well as plenty of talented gamers participated to vie for a spot in the official Formula E esports teams who competed in the Formula E: Accelerate and a chance to compete for a share of the €100,000 prize-pool and some real-world seat-time with laps in a Gen2 Formula E car.

Danish sim racer, Frederik Rasmussen crowned as the Formula E: Accelerate Champion ahead of Erhan Jajovski and gets his hands on the €20,000 top prize and a drive in a real Gen2 Formula E car. ROKiT Venturi Racing secured the Teams' Championship Title, finishing 36 points clear of the rest of Formula E field.

Teams and drivers

Calendar

Results

Season summary

Championship standings

Scoring system 

Points were awarded to the top 10 classified finishers in the race, three points for pole sitter and one point was given to the driver who set the fastest lap inside the top ten.

In the event of a tie at the conclusion of the championship, a count-back system is used as a tie-breaker, with a drivers'/teams' best result used to decide the standings.

Drivers' Championship standings 

Note:
  – Double points were awarded in the last race at the Rome ePrix, Rome.

Teams' Championship standings 

Note:
  – Double points were awarded in the last race at the Rome ePrix, Rome.
 The standings are sorted by best result, rows are not related to the drivers. In case of tie on points, the best positions achieved determined the outcome.

References

External links 
 

2021 in esports
2020–21 Formula E season